Allegra Goodman (born 1967) is an American author based in Cambridge, Massachusetts. Goodman wrote and illustrated her first novel at the age of seven.

Biography
Allegra Goodman was born in Brooklyn, New York, and raised in Hawaii. The daughter of Lenn and Madeleine Goodman, she was brought up as a Conservative Jew. Her mother, who died in 1996, was a professor of genetics and women's studies, then assistant vice president at the University of Hawaii at Manoa for many years, before moving on to Vanderbilt University in the 1990s. Her father, Lenn E. Goodman, is a professor of philosophy at Vanderbilt.

Goodman graduated from Punahou School in 1985. She then went on to Harvard University, where she earned an A.B. degree and met her husband, David Karger. Both were regulars at Harvard Hillel, and prayed in Harvard Hillel Orthodox Minyan. They then went on to do graduate work at Stanford University, where Goodman earned a Ph.D. degree in English literature, in 1996.

Goodman's younger sister, Paula Fraenkel, is an oncologist. Fraenkel's experience in research labs is one of the inspirations for Goodman's 2006 novel Intuition.

Her short story "La Vita Nuova" was selected for The Best American Short Stories 2011 and was broadcast on Public Radio International's Selected Shorts in February 2012.

Goodman and Karger live in Cambridge, Massachusetts, where Karger is a professor in computer science at MIT. They have four children, three boys and a girl.

Awards and honors
 1991, winner, Whiting Award for Fiction
 1998, finalist, National Book Award for Fiction
 2009, shortlisted, Wellcome Book Prize, Intuition

Bibliography

Novels
 Kaaterskill Falls (The Dial Press 1998; paperback Dial Press Trade Paperback 1999) , 
 Paradise Park (The Dial Press 2001, Dial Press Trade Paperback 2002) , 
 Intuition (The Dial Press 2006), 
 The Other Side of the Island (New York: Razorbill, 2008) 
 The Cookbook Collector (The Dial Press 2010) 
 The Chalk Artist: A Novel (The Dial Press 2017) 
 Sam: A Novel (The Dial Press 2023)

Short story collections
 Total Immersion (Harper & Row 1989; paperback Dial Press Trade Paperback 1998) , 
 The Family Markowitz (Farrar Straus & Giroux 1996; softcover Washington Square Press 1997) ,

Short Stories (selected)

References

External links
 Allegra Goodman's webpage
 Allegra Goodman profile at Bookreporter.com
 Profile at The Whiting Foundation
 2006 Newspaper article on Allegra Goodman
 2006 MSNBC article on Allegra Goodman
 2006 Allegra Goodman interview in The Washington Post
 Allegra Goodman entry on The Literary Encyclopedia

1967 births
Living people
20th-century American novelists
20th-century American short story writers
20th-century American women writers
21st-century American Jews
21st-century American novelists
21st-century American short story writers
21st-century American women writers
American women novelists
American women short story writers
Baalei teshuva
Harvard University alumni
Jewish American novelists
Jewish women writers
The New Yorker people
Novelists from Hawaii
Novelists from Massachusetts
Novelists from New York (state)
Punahou School alumni
Stanford University alumni
Writers from Brooklyn
Writers from Cambridge, Massachusetts